Asclepias stenophylla is a species of flowering plant in the dogbane family (Apocynaceae) commonly called slimleaf milkweed and narrow-leaved green milkweed.

Description
Asclepias stenophylla is a herbaceous perennial growing from a carrot-like or tuberous, vertical root that is  3 to 10 dm long. Each plant typically has one or two stems with many thin leaves. It has milky sap. The leaves are linear in shape and 6 to 15 cm long and 5 to 8 mm wide. The pale greenish to yellow flowers are arranged into axillary umbels with 10 to 25 flowers per umbel. The umbels are subsessile or have very short peduncles. The flowers have very small horns which are attached to the hoods most of their length, with the short tip and terminal lobes being free. The fruits are upright, slender follicles 9 to 12 cm long. Flowering occurs in June thru August.

Habitat
Asclepias stenophylla is found in dry prairies;  and also in loess and gravel prairies. In Minnesota it has been found growing in gravelly soils at the foot of hill prairies on the south-west facing sides of the hills, which is similar to the species typical habitat in other states including limestone glades.

Distribution

Asclepias stenophylla grows naturally in south eastern Minnesota through the great plains, to south eastern Montana to northern Texas, east to South Dakota, Missouri and Arkansas. 

It is listed as endangered in some US states:
 In Illinois, where it is found on hill prairies in the western part of the state. 
 In Minnesota where the plants are believed to be the result of the natural expansion of this species range, it is 500 km from the species main range.
 In Iowa, where it is found in the most western part of the state,  which is the north-eastern edge of the species natural current range. 

In the US state of Montana it is listed a species of concern.

References 

stenophylla